Aashiq is a 1962 Hindi movie directed by Hrishikesh Mukherjee. The film stars Raj Kapoor, Nanda, Padmini, Keshto Mukherjee and Leela Chitnis. The music of film was composed by Shankar Jaikishan.

Cast 
Raj Kapoor as Gopal/Uday Kumar
Nanda as Renu
Padmini as Priti
Raj Mehra as Amar Singh (Pratap's father)
Honey Irani as Sangeeta
Mukri as D'Souza
Keshto Mukherjee as Bhekhu
Abhi Bhattacharya as Pratap
Leela Chitnis as Pratap's mother
Nana Palsikar as Thakur (Renu's father)
Achala Sachdev as Renu's mother
Vishwa Mehra as hotel manager
Parashuram as Munim
Madhumati as Jaya Fernandes (paired with D'Souza)
Nazir Kashmiri as doctor

Soundtrack

External links 
 

1962 films
Films directed by Hrishikesh Mukherjee
Films scored by Shankar–Jaikishan
1960s Hindi-language films